Mikhail Konstantinovich Clodt, Freiherr (Baron) von Jürgensburg (1832–1902; both Saint Petersburg) was a Russian Imperial realistic painter.

Biography
Mikhail Clodt was born to the artistic family of barons Clodt von Jürgensburg, his father  was the first Russian wood engraver, his uncle Peter Clodt von Jürgensburg was a famous Russian sculptor.

He learnt drawing at the Saint Petersburg Mining Cadet Corps, then at the Imperial Academy of Arts (1851–1858). After receiving a Large Gold Medal he received a scholarship for three years to study painting in France, Switzerland and Italy but abandoned his foreign trip in a year. He complained that the foreign landscapes would not inspire him and that French and Italian school of painting is inferior to Russian one. After returning Clodt got permissions to use the rest of the scholarship funds in his travel over Russia.

In 1863 Clodt got recognition for his painting Highway in Autumn. Even higher praise was given for his work In the Field (1872) and the Forest view in Midday (1878). Observers celebrated his devotion to Russian landscape, attention to the details and perspective. On the other hand, popular art critic Vladimir Stasov noted petty naturalism and the "slavish following to reality" in many Clodt works. As an example of such a work he stated Cows at Watering (1879). In both his devotion to the Russian landscape and some petty naturalism Clodt was probably the forerunner of Ivan Shishkin.

Mikhail Clodt was a founding member of the Peredvizhniki movement, but the Peredvizhniki did not completely consider him as  their own. That was partially due to the sharp criticisms from Clodt and partially because of him keeping his professorship of the Imperial Academy of Arts (1871–1886). After Clodt's particularly sharp criticism over Arkhip Kuindzhi Clodt was forced to break with the Peredvizhniki. Soon he retired from the Academy as well.

Clodt did not paint anything of value after the 1870s. Half-blind and financially broken, he died in 1902.

Selected paintings

References

19th-century painters from the Russian Empire
Russian male painters
Painters from Saint Petersburg
Realist painters
Landscape artists
Russian people of German descent
1832 births
1902 deaths
19th-century male artists from the Russian Empire